The Spirit Indestructible is the fifth studio album by Canadian singer-songwriter Nelly Furtado. The album was released on 14 September 2012. Furtado served as the executive producer for the album as well as a principal writer. Further production on The Spirit Indestructible comes from the likes of Darkchild, Salaam Remi, Mike Angelakos, Bob Rock, Fraser T Smith, Di Genius, The Demolition Crew, John Shanks and Tiësto.

Four singles were released from the album; "Big Hoops (Bigger the Better)" was released as the album's lead single, then the second European single and title track was "Spirit Indestructible", while "Parking Lot" was chosen as second North American single. The third European single was "Waiting for the Night". The album was nominated for the Juno Award for Pop Album of the Year in 2013.

Background
The Spirit Indestructible is Furtado's first English language studio album since Loose (2006). She began to work in 2009, just after the release of her Spanish album. Furtado worked with a variety of producers. She first worked with Salaam Remi, who produced tracks for her fourth album Mi Plan. She described his sound as "classic", "authentic" and "super soulful". While after she went in Jamaica to work on reggae material with Di Genius on the track "Don't Leave Me", she called it as a "real moment on the album". By 2011, she collaborated with Darkchild, who produced the bulk of the album; Furtado spoke on working with him saying, "I feel like a child in a playground, uninhibited and happy". The first track they worked on was "Spirit Indestructible", which she called an "ode to the spirit which resides in all of us and triumphs over anything".

During her trip to Kenya for Free the Children, she met The Kenyan Boys Choir with whom she worked on a track called "Thoughts" produced by herself and The Demolition Crew. It was also remixed by Tiësto and added to the deluxe edition of the album. Furtado described it as the "perfect laidback track" and shows the "mellow side" of the DJ. By February 2012, via a TSI webisode, she worked with Bob Rock and Fraser T Smith. From that session, "Believers (Arab Spring)" and "End of the World" made the final cut. She recorded around forty tracks for this album, and twenty two made the final cut. Other songs considered for inclusion on the album but did not make the final cut are "Alone", "Lose", "The Edge" and "Mystery"—which she performed at a festival. Talking about the recording sessions, she stated, "It's overall quite a simple, at times juvenile album that was very liberating to create and gave me immense joy."

Concept and influences
Following the introduction, she said that nostalgia is a major theme of the album and it revisits her past in a "fresh and colorful way". Also, she included that she wrote the songs in "intense personal growth" and they have "incredible meaning" to her. The first single, "Big Hoops (Bigger the Better)", is about finding strength and confidence in the size of her earrings. She is "channeling her 14-year-old-self", as she talks about her love for hip hop and R&B. The song is inspired by when Nelly took her big sister's hoop earrings and went with her friends to the mall and freestyled "like they were already famous". She quotes lyrics from the likes of Boyz II Men, Brandy, Salt N Pepa. She stated, "Hip-hop was super-exotic to us in Canada [...] I remember attaching a wire clothing hanger to the antenna of my radio in my bedroom, so I could get the frequency and get that station and listen to the top 10 every night." Ironically, Darkchild is responsible for the songs she loved when she was young, which she only realized later. "Parking Lot", the first official single in the United States, is where she revisits the memories of her hometown, as noted by the teenage-like lyrics. She sings "Meet us in the parking lot/we're gonna turn the speakers up", over a boom-boom-clap beat and a horn loop. She also referred to the song as her take on Bryan Adams' 1984 song "Summer of '69". "Waiting for the Night" is inspired by a diary she kept as smitten sixteen-year-old on a summer vacation on São Miguel Island, Portugal.

The second European single, "Spirit Indestructible", is a tribute to the humanity. It was inspired by people that she met and people in history that she has read in books about. Her trip in Kenya, for Free the Children inspired her to write the song. The theme of spirituality is also developed on songs like "Miracles", "The Most Beautiful Thing" or "Believers (Arab Spring)" where she sings about grace, joy and faith. "High Life" is about what happens after all your dreams came true and the process of running from your hometown to seek "success", and what happens when you obtain it. The song is partly inspired by a breakdown she had on stage during her Get Loose Tour. Furtado spoke on her influence for the album, saying, "I experienced real joy for the first time, Communal joy. Obviously giving birth was joyful, personally. But when I went to Africa, I really experienced people celebrating and being joyful together for the first time. It really reinforced my belief in humanity. It reminded me who I am. That's why the album is so childlike. The experience also inspired the album's title track, which pays tribute to mankind's ability to overcome adversity. "So many things have happened that have inspired me in a lot of ways to believe in humanity." Furtado spoke about the title of the album saying, "It's an ode to the spirit which resides in all of us and triumphs over anything. It is inspired by people I have met, and special moments in history that I have read about." then about the album artwork "It's light in color so that it's black-sharpie-ready for when I sign CDs for the beautiful fans." The whole album is described as "raw and honest" and a "friendly punch in the face." The album is eclectic; it contains elements from hip hop, R&B, dance, rock and drum & bass. Furtado proclaims that the overall sound of The Spirit Indestructible would be most similar to her debut album Whoa, Nelly!, with the romance of Folklore, the drama of Loose, and the passion of Mi Plan. The influences for the album range from Janelle Monáe, The xx, to Florence and the Machine.

Critical reception

The Spirit Indestructible received generally mixed to average reviews from music critics. At Metacritic, which assigns a weighted mean rating out of 100 to reviews from mainstream critics, the album received an average score of 57, based on 9 reviews.

Commercial performance
The Spirit Indestructible failed to replicate the success of her previous English-language album, Loose, due to poor promotion and minimal chart impact of the album's singles. In the United States, The Spirit Indestructible debuted at number 79, selling almost 6,000 copies in its first week, which represents a considerable drop from her previous album, Loose, which debuted at number one with 219,000 copies. In her native Canada, the album debuted at number 18 selling 2,700 copies in its first week. Furtado did not feel bad about the underwhelming performance in North America, stating that "I've had kind of everything happen to me commercially and at different levels. I've had different scenes and I've dabbled in a lot of markets so I see the music world as very global and I'm always looking for new avenues and opportunities, so one chart or anything doesn't necessarily [mean anything.]"

Internationally, The Spirit Indestructible struggled to make an impact. In Europe, the album's initial reception was mild. It became Furtado's first studio album to miss the UK top 40, entering the UK Albums Chart at number 46 on sales of 2,637 copies. The Spirit Indestructible also missed the top 40 in the Netherlands, Belgium and Spain, and charted outside the top 30 in Italy and Poland. The album was a success in Germany and Switzerland, debuting within the top five in both countries; as well as becoming a top 10 album in Austria and Czech Republic. In Asia, the album charted in the top 40 of the international South Korean album charts.

Singles
The lead single from The Spirit Indestructible, "Big Hoops (Bigger the Better)", was released digitally on 17 April 2012. It was officially sent to US radio on 1 May 2012. It was released in Germany on 18 May 2012 and in the United Kingdom on 3 June 2012. The single was intended to be a club single but was still released to all formats as the lead single. The second European single from the album is the title track, "Spirit Indestructible". The official music video for "Spirit Indestructible" was released on 18 July 2012. The single was made available for purchase at several international iTunes stores on 31 July 2012, and subsequently in the United States on 14 August 2012. It was released in Germany on 3 August 2012. "Parking Lot", the second North American single was sent to radio on 17 September, with the official music video coming out that day too. "Waiting for the Night" is the third European single, and was released as a digital download in Germany on 14 December 2012.

Track listing 

Notes
 signifies a vocal producer

Personnel
Credits for the digital deluxe edition of The Spirit Indestructible.

 Nelly Furtado – vocals, backing vocals, songwriter, backing vocal producer, mixing, producer, vocal producer
 Brian Allison – bass
 Rusty Anderson – electric guitar
 Michael Angelakos – backing vocals, producer
 Keith Armstrong – assistant engineer
 Beatriz Artola – additional vocal engineer, engineer
 Hernst Bellevue – additional keyboards
 Roy Bittan – accordion
 Paul Bushnell – bass
 Brandon N. Caddell – assistant engineer
 Karl Campbell – additional clapping
 Demacio "Demo" Castellon – drums, engineer, keyboards, mixing, vocal engineer, vocal producer
 Matt Champlin – engineer, mixing
 Alan Chang – keyboards, synth strings
 Dan Chase – additional engineer, programming
 Chris Smith Management – management
 LaShawn Daniels – additional backing vocals
 The Demolition Crew – additional drum programming, additional programming, producer, remix
 Di Genius – engineer, instruments, producer
 Gleyder "Gee" Disla – engineer, mixing
 Jason "Metal" Donkersgoed – assistant engineer
 Jamie Edwards – electric guitar, keyboards
 Lars Fox – Pro Tools editing
 Lazonate Franklin – additional backing vocals
 Josh Freese – drums, programming
 António José Furtado – voice
 Chris Gehringer – mastering
 Brad Haehnel – mixing
 Eric Helmkamp – engineer
 Vincent Henry – guitar, saxophone
 Rodney Jerkins – mixing, producer, vocal producer
 Charles Judge – keyboards, synth strings
 Solomon Kabiru – Kenyan Boys Choir soloist
 Devrim Karaoĝlu – drums, keyboards, mixing, producer, programming, strings
 Nik Karpen – assistant engineer
 Sean Kelly – guitar
 Kenyan Boys Choir – vocals
 Andre Lindal – producer
 Chris Lord-Alge – mixing
 Kim Lumpkin – production coordinator
 Thomas Lumpkins – additional backing vocals
 Manny Marroquin – mixing
 Kieron Menzies – engineer, mixing
 Alex Moore – additional backing vocals
 Mogollon – art direction
 Greg Morgan – additional drum programming, sound designer
 Dylan Murray – vocals
 Nas – rap
 Peter Ndung'u – hand drums
 Nevis – artwork additional
 Cliff Njora – nyatiti
 Rick Nowels – acoustic guitar, keyboards, producer, vocal engineer, vocal producer
 Jeanette Olsson – backing vocals
 Thom Panunzio – A&R, vocals
 Brent Paschke – guitar
 Erich Preston – engineer
 Niko Khale Warren a.k.a. Ace Primo – backing vocals, rap
 Andrés Recio – Lisbon production coordinator
 Dean Reid – drums, engineer, programming
 Salaam Remi – arrangement, bass, drums, guitar, keyboards, producer
 Bob Rock – producer
 Jeff Rothschild – additional drums, engineer, programming
 Mary Rozzi – photography
 Irene Salazar – additional backing vocals
 Jeianna Salazar – additional backing vocals
 Judah Salazar – additional backing vocals
 Sariah Salazar – additional backing vocals
 Andrew Schubert – additional mix engineer
 Keith Scott – guitar
 John Shanks – bass, guitar, keyboards, producer
 Joel Shearer – guitar
 Marco Sipriano – engineer
 Chris "Governor" Smith – vocals
 Fraser T Smith – bass, engineer, guitar, keyboards, mixing, producer
 Ash Soan – drums, percussion
 Franklin Socorro – engineer
 Jordan Stillwell – engineer
 Shari Sutcliffe – musician contracting
 Sara Tavares – backing vocals
 Tiësto – additional producer, remix
 Brad Townsend – additional mix engineer
 Michael Turco – drums, engineer, keyboards
 Jeanne Venton – A&R administration
 Orlando Vitto – engineer
 Henry Wanjala – Kenyan Boys Choir vocal arrangement, shaker, Swahili translation
 Tony-Kaya Whitney – voice
 Chris Zane – producer
 Ianthe Zevos – creative director

Charts

Release history

References

2012 albums
Albums produced by Rodney Jerkins
Albums produced by Salaam Remi
Interscope Records albums
Nelly Furtado albums
Interscope Geffen A&M Records albums